Wet Beaver Wilderness is a 6,155-acre (2,491 ha) wilderness area located in the Coconino National Forest in the U.S. state of Arizona.

Wet Beaver Creek is a perennial stream with one major tributary, Dry Beaver Creek.  The confluence of the two is at McGuireville, Arizona.  Beaver Creek flows past Montezuma Well and Montezuma Castle before joining the Verde River near Camp Verde, Arizona.

Wildlife
The year-round waters in the Wet Beaver Wilderness attract large numbers of wildlife, including elk, deer, bear, mountain lion, and a variety of smaller mammals, reptiles, and birds.

Trails
The Bell Trail is a historic stock trail, which follows Beaver Creek upstream for about  before climbing steeply up to the Mogollon Rim at the southern edge of the Colorado Plateau. The only other trail in the Wilderness is the  Apache Maid Trail.

Recreation
Common recreational activities in the Wet Beaver Wilderness include hiking, horseback riding, fishing (about 12 fishable miles), swimming, wildlife watching, and photography.  The popular Beaver Creek campground, located outside the Wilderness at the creek crossing just below the ranger station, is operated by the US Forest Service and requires a fee.

Overnight camping is prohibited by Forest Order between the parking area at the west end of the canyon, near the old Forest Service Ranger Station and the Campground, and continuing upstream (east) to a signed point approximately one-quarter mile upstream from where the Bell Trail (FT #13) crosses Wet Beaver Creek.  This closure has been established to reduce the impact the area has received in recent years.

Fish species
 Rainbow trout
 Brown trout
 Smallmouth bass
 Bullfrogs

See also
 V Bar V Heritage Siteone-half mile west
 List of Arizona Wilderness Areas
 List of U.S. Wilderness Areas
 Wilderness Act

References

 
 Coconino National Forest Red Rock Ranger District

External links

 Wet Beaver Wilderness – Coconino National Forest
 Wet Beaver Wilderness – Wilderness.net
 Bell Trail, Wet Beaver Creek – ArizonaHikingTrails.com
 Beaver Creek Campground – Coconino National Forest
 Video of Wet Beaver Creek – Arizona Game & Fish
 

Wilderness areas of Arizona
Beaver Creek Canyon
Mogollon Rim
Rivers of the Mogollon Rim
Protected areas of Coconino County, Arizona
IUCN Category Ib
Protected areas of Yavapai County, Arizona
Biosphere reserves of the United States
Rivers of Arizona
Rivers of Coconino County, Arizona
Coconino National Forest